The Palazzo degli Strazzaroli is a Renaissance-style urban palace located at Piazza di Porta Ravegnana #1  in central Bologna, region of Emilia-Romagna, Italy.

History
The palace was commissioned in 1486-96 by the guild of the  Drappieri (cloth merchants and haberdashers) from the architect Giovanni Piccinini of Como. The palace was refurbished in 1620, by adding a balcony and a niche with a Madonna sculpted by Gabriele Fiorini. A property at the site may have belonged to the Pavanesi family, exiled for supporting a conspiracy by the Pepoli.

Carlo Cesare Malvasia cites Gaspare Nadi as the architect in 1496.

In 1986, it was the property of the Monetti family.

References

Houses completed in the 16th century
Strazzaroli
Renaissance architecture in Bologna